Vladimir Alexandrovich Simonov (born 7 June 1957) is a Soviet and Russian actor. He appeared in more than sixty films since 1979. People's Artist of the Russian Federation (2001). Simonov was awarded the theatre prize Crystal Turandot in 2016.

Selected filmography

References

External links 

1957 births
Living people
People from Oktyabrsk
Soviet male film actors
Soviet male television actors
Soviet male stage actors
Russian male film actors
Russian male television actors
Russian male stage actors
20th-century Russian male actors
People's Artists of Russia
Honored Artists of the Russian Federation